Népújság may refer to:
 Népújság (Romania), a Hungarian daily newspaper in Târgu Mureș, Romania
 Népújság (Slovenia), a Hungarian weekly newspaper in Slovenia
 Tolnai Népúság, a Hungarian daily newspaper in Hungary